Trine was a 32-foot trimaran sailboat designed by Dick Newick, one the earliest designs in his career (prior to the  Trice), which contributed substantially to the revival of multihull vessels from the 1960s to the late 20th century.

See also
List of multihulls
Trice
Cheers
Dick Newick

References

Trimarans
1960s sailing yachts